Indiana State Road 727 (SR 727) is a very short east–west state highway in Indiana, lying entirely within Steuben County.  The route is a spur off of SR 127 that serves Pokagon State Park.  The western terminus of SR 727 is at the main entrance into Pokagon State Park and its eastern terminus is at SR 127 two miles south of SR 120, immediately northwest of the SR 127 interchange off of I-69.

Route description 
Starting from the main entrance into Pokagon State Park, SR 727 travels due east through a heavily forested area. Curving to the southeast, SR 727's journey comes to an abrupt end upon arriving at its junction with SR 127.

History
SR 727 was first authorized in 1934 between Ashley and Pleasant Lake, along Steuben county road 400W and 500S. During 1935 the Indiana State Highway Commission wanted to improve SR 727 to hard type of driving surface, so in August 1935 the state accepted a bid for $16,246 . The resurfacing was completed during 1936. The designation was extended west of Ashley to SR 327, south of Helmer, in 1940. In 1965 Indiana State Highway Commission truncated SR 727 in Ashley at its intersection with SR 4. The highway commission completed a major rerouting of SR 727 around 1968 when it was moved to its current location.

Major intersections

References

External links

 State Road 727 Endpoint Photos

727
Transportation in Steuben County, Indiana
State highways in the United States shorter than one mile